Golf telecasts have aired on NBC since 1954, with some of its earliest telecasts having included the 1954 U.S. Open, and the first televised coverage of the Ryder Cup in 1959.

Presently, NBC televises around 8 PGA Tour events per-season, alternating with CBS on the FedEx Cup Playoffs since 2022. It also serves as the broadcast television outlet for two of the men's majors, the U.S. Open and The Open Championship. NBC has occasionally aired coverage for selected European Tour and LPGA events, although the majority of these tours' events are broadcast by sister network Golf Channel.

After NBC's parent company NBC Universal was acquired by Comcast–owner of Golf Channel –in February 2011, the channel's operations were merged directly into NBC Sports, and golf broadcasts on NBC took on the Golf Channel on NBC branding. Since 2022, especially with the move of early-round telecasts for majors to USA Network and Peacock, the Golf Channel brand has been increasingly downplayed from NBC's golf coverage in favor of the main NBC Sports branding, although Golf Channel remains responsible for the golf telecasts aired across all NBCUniversal platforms.

Coverage overview

Early years
NBC first began televising golf events after it was awarded the television rights to the U.S. Open in 1954 with Lindsey Nelson anchoring the coverage from the 18th hole tower. In 1959, NBC provided the first ever telecast (airing two hours of highlights) of the Ryder Cup. The 1962 U.S. Open, marked the first time that NBC covered golf on a Sunday. The U.S. Open continued to air on the network through the 1965 event, however NBC rebuffed a long-term deal to broadcast the event when the United States Golf Association (USGA) decided on a true contract in 1966.

The network, however, did televise a handful of PGA Tour events over the following decades. For example, NBC's broadcast of the 1962 Tournament of Champions as the first color golf telecast. Five years later, NBC broadcast the Hawaiian Open Golf Tournament, which was the first live color sports transmission from Hawaii to the U.S. mainland.

In 1983, NBC televised the first Skins Game ever held, with Vin Scully and Ben Crenshaw serving as announcers for the tournament broadcast. From 1983 to 1989, Scully juggled duties for both golf and Major League Baseball telecasts for NBC, usually teaming with Lee Trevino. The only notable affiliate not to televise the first event was KYW-TV (now a CBS owned-and-operated station) in Philadelphia. In 1991, coverage of the Skins Game moved to ABC Sports, after NBC obtained the rights to broadcast Notre Dame college football games.

After Vin Scully left NBC Sports following the network's loss of the Major League Baseball package to CBS, Bryant Gumbel, who was still co-hosting Today at the time, took over as NBC's primary golf anchor. In 1991, Gumbel was replaced by Charlie Jones and subsequently, Dick Enberg and (after the former left NBC Sports for CBS in the year 2000) Dan Hicks.

The American Century Celebrity Golf Classic was held in 1990 and sponsored by NBC, which broadcasts the second- and third-round coverage. The game NBC Sports Real Golf was unveiled at the 17th annual American Century Championship Celebrity Golf Event and promoted during NBC's broadcast of the event. NBC generally televised around five regular PGA Tour events per season at this time. In 1991, the network acquired the broadcast rights to the Ryder Cup.

Acquisition of U.S. Open rights (1995)
In 1995, NBC Sports acquired rights to the USGA championships, including the U.S. Open, from ESPN/ABC. ESPN retained rights to a portion of the weekday coverage, however NBC was the dominant rightsholder, including exclusive coverage of the weekend rounds. This took NBC's coverage to a new level, and marked the first time in the modern era of television that the network had televised a major championship. NBC, and its lead analyst Johnny Miller (who joined NBC in 1990), became synonymous with the U.S. Open, televising it for the next 20 years, through 2014.

Expansion of PGA Tour rights (2007)
In January 2006, the PGA Tour announced a new set of television deals covering 2007 to 2012, increase the number of events covered by NBC Sports from five to ten. The deal also renewed broadcast deals for the Ryder Cup and the USGA Championships, including the U.S. Open. NBC is the only network which provide four days of major tournament coverage (CBS, which airs the Masters and the PGA Championship, only provides weekend coverage of its tournaments; starting in 2010, the Open Championship would not be aired live on a major broadcast network at all, with all four rounds airing on ESPN and ABC providing only edited highlights of the event).

NBC carried the weekend coverage of the JELD-WEN Tradition in 2007, 2009 and 2010. Golf Channel covered the early rounds (and all four rounds in 2008 while NBC carried the Summer Olympic Games from Beijing). NBC carried a tape delayed broadcast of the World Series of Golf, which was held from May 13 to 16, 2007, on June 23 and 24 of that year; the 2008 event of the series, played from May 12 to 15, and was televised by CBS on June 28 and 29.

In 2007, The Shark Shootout was moved to December, and was broadcast live by both Golf Channel and NBC. The event was originally broadcast in the United States by sister cable channel USA Network, and CBS – with USA broadcasting the first round on a tape-delayed basis, and CBS handling the second round live. The final round was not broadcast live to the entire country, as CBS' commitment to the NFL only allowed the round as it took place to air in the Eastern and Central Time Zones, with the rest of the U.S. seeing the event beginning at 4:00 p.m. Eastern Time.

Golf Channel re-branding (2011)
In January 2011, Comcast, owners of Golf Channel, acquired a majority stake in the NBC network's parent company NBC Universal. Comcast's existing sports properties were merged into the NBC Sports division, allowing Golf Channel to pool its personalities and other personnel with NBC. As a result of this synergy, Golf Channel took over production of NBC's golf telecasts, which were now co-branded under the "Golf Channel on NBC" banner, beginning at the 2011 WGC-Accenture Match Play Championship, with a co-branded logo adding the NBC peacock to Golf Channel's existing logo (the co-branded presentation would also migrate to Golf Channel proper shortly afterward).

While most golf broadcasts on NBC used Golf Channel's on-air branding as graphics packages as a result of the changes, the Players Championship, Ryder Cup and USGA tournaments maintain the distinctive theme music that NBC used prior to the rebranding (such as the theme from The Man from Snowy River for the Players, and Yanni's "In Celebration of Man" for the U.S. Open, which, with a rearrangement, was also temporarily used for the Open Championship).

In both 2013 and 2014, NBC broadcast weekend coverage of the Aberdeen Asset Management Scottish Open from Scotland. The 2013 event was played at Castle Stuart near Inverness, while the 2014 event was hosted by Royal Aberdeen, near Aberdeen. Coverage of the tournament during both years was anchored by Rich Lerner, and the action was called by lead European Tour announcer Dougie Donnelly and Golf Channel's lead PGA Tour analyst Frank Nobilo.

Loss of U.S. Open rights and acquiring The Open Championship (2014–2019)
In August 2013, the USGA signed a broadcasting contract with Fox Sports, effective with the 2015 tournament season, ending NBC's relationship with the association after 20 years. Fox, which by the time of its first U.S. Open will have televised just two PGA Tour sanctioned events in its history (the unofficial CVS Caremark Charity Classic in 2011 and the unofficial Franklin Templeton Shootout in 2014), paid US$1 billion for the exclusive rights to all USGA championship events. Johnny Miller expressed disappointment at the loss, saying that he "had a feeling" NBC would not retain the rights, and that Fox would not be able to "fall out of a tree and do the U.S. Open". The 2014 U.S. Open at Pinehurst Resort was the network's 20th, and final, U.S. Open telecast in the modern era.

On June 8, 2015, it was announced that NBC and Golf Channel had acquired rights to The Open Championship under a 12-year deal, replacing ESPN. The R&A was, reportedly, won over by NBC's rights fee (which is approximately doubled in comparison to ESPN), and the performance of NBC's broadcasts of the Premier League, which air in a similar weekend morning time slot in the U.S.. The deal restored a men's major back to NBC for the first time since 2014, gave Golf Channel coverage of its first-ever major, and returned the Open to broadcast network television. Originally stated to begin in 2017, it was reported on October 12, 2015, that ESPN had opted out the final year of its contract to NBC, thus causing NBC coverage to begin in 2016 instead, mirroring a similar move by the BBC (who opted out to new rightsholder Sky Sports).

In January 2016, former CBS analyst David Feherty joined NBC to become a full-time contributor for its coverage and Golf Channel. Feherty already hosted a self-titled interview series for Golf Channel. Long-time ESPN personality Mike Tirico made his on-air debut with NBC during the 2016 Open Championship.

NBC and Golf Channel broadcast the revived golf tournaments at the 2016 Summer Olympics, as part of NBC's coverage of the Games. NBC staff served as the host broadcaster for the golf events on behalf of Olympic Broadcasting Services (OBS).

PGA Tour renewal, regaining the U.S. Open (2020–present) 
In 2020, NBC renewed its rights to the PGA Tour through 2030 under an eight-year deal beginning in 2022. While NBC will still air an average of 8 tournaments per-year, coverage of the final three FedEx Cup playoff events will now alternate between CBS and NBC.

On June 29, 2020, it was announced that Fox had withdrawn from its contract to carry USGA tournaments, and had sold the remaining seven years of the contract to NBC Sports through 2027. It was reported that the rescheduling of the majors caused by the COVID-19 pandemic was a factor in the decision (Fox had reportedly proposed moving the 2020 U.S. Open exclusively to FS1 to overcome conflicts with weekend college football and the NFL), and that Fox had originally discussed working with NBC before negotiating the withdrawal instead. The first event televised under the new contract was the 2020 U.S. Women's Amateur.

In November 2021, it was announced that early round coverage of the U.S. Open, U.S. Women's Open, The Open Championship, and the Women's Open, will be moved from Golf Channel to USA Network beginning in 2022.

Tournaments

Current
PGA Tour, annual coverage
 Sentry Tournament of Champions (2013–present; except 2018)
 The Honda Classic (1982–present)
 Arnold Palmer Invitational (1974–present)
 The Players Championship (1988–2019, 2021–present)
 WGC-Dell Match Play (2007–2019, 2021–present)
 Valero Texas Open (2013-2015, 2019, 2021–present)
 The Open Championship (2016–2019, 2021–present)
 Valspar Championship (2007–2019, 2022–present)

 Tournaments alternated with CBS
 NBC Tournaments airing on CBS because of Winter Olympics
 Honda Classic (2018)
 WGC-Dell Match Play Championship (2010, 2014)
 CBS Tournaments airing on NBC because of Super Bowl
 Phoenix Open: 2007, 2013, 2016, 2019, 2021
 Los Angeles Open: 2010
 FedEx Cup playoff tournaments (in even-numbered years)
 St. Jude Championship (2022–present)
 BMW Championship (2007–present, even-numbered years starting in 2022)
 The Tour Championship (2007–present, even-numbered years starting in 2022)

USGA
 U.S. Open (1954–1965, 1995–2014, 2020–present)
 U.S. Senior Open (1995–2014, 2021–present)
 U.S. Women's Open (1995–2014, 2020–present)
 U.S. Amateur (1995–2014, 2020–present)

LPGA Tour
 Diamond Resorts Tournament of Champions (2019–present)
 CME Group Tour Championship (2019–present)

Majors and special events
 Ryder Cup (1991–present)
 Presidents Cup (2000–present)
 Senior PGA Championship (1990–present)
 Hero World Challenge (2007–present)
 PNC Father/Son Challenge (1995-2008, 2012–present)
 American Century Championship (1990–present)
 KPMG Women's PGA Championship (2015–present)
 The Evian Championship (2013–present)
 Women's British Open (2016–present)
 Senior Open Championship (2016–present)
 The Solheim Cup (1994-2002, 2017–present)
 Augusta National Women's Amateur (2019–present)
 QBE Shootout (2007–2013, 2017–present)

Former
 Bob Hope Chrysler Classic (1960s–1998)
 Farmers Insurance Open (until 1998)
 Northern Trust Open (2010, CBS Super Bowl year)
 BellSouth Classic (1999–2006)
 Zurich Classic of New Orleans (1975–1998, 2007–2008)
 WGC-Cadillac Championship/Doral Open (1999-2016)
 Houston Open (2007–2018)
 The Tradition (2007–2010)
 Travelers Championship (1982–1983
 Senior Players Championship (2007–2009)
 Sony Open in Hawaii (2015)
 UL International Crown (2016)
 WGC-Mexico Championship (2017–2021)

European Tour
 Aberdeen Asset Management Scottish Open (2013–2021)

Commentators

See also
Gillette Cavalcade of Sports
PGA Tour on CBS

References

External links

Golf on NBC
NBC
NBC original programming
1954 American television series debuts
1960s American television series
1970s American television series
1980s American television series
1990s American television series
2000s American television series
2010s American television series
2020s American television series